Thartharat is a 1989 Indian Marathi-language action comedy film written and directed by Mahesh Kothare and produced by Arvind Samant. The film stars Mahesh Kothare, Laxmikant Berde, Nivedita Joshi, Priya Arun, Deepak Shirke, Jairam Kulkarni and Rahul Solapurkar.

Plot 
The film begins with Taklu Haiwan (Rahul Solapurkar) as a sadistic crime lord who is funding crime in Mumbai, always eluding the authorities and remaining fugitive. To that end, CID Inspector Mahesh Jadhav (Mahesh Kothare), a respected police officer, is working on his attempts to nabbing Taklu Haiwan. Uma Desai (Nivedita Joshi), a journalist of the daily newspaper Apradh, interviews Mahesh about his bravery in facing Taklu Haiwan's gang. The two soon fall in love with each other. In the small village of Shrirangpur, Maharashtra, Uma's brother Laxmikant Ghorpade alias Lakshya (Laxmikant Berde) is also a journalist of the daily newspaper Jhunjaar run by his father Jhunjaarrao Ghorpade (Jairam Kulkarni). 

Jhunjaar is suffering from bad sales due to the Apradh being its competitor. Instead of helping Jhunjaarrao increase the sales, Lakshya spends most of his time with his girlfriend Ganga (Priya Arun) whose arrogant father Constable 100 (Deepak Shirke) disapproves of their relationship. Jhunjaarrao often reprimands Lakshya for his carelessness in bettering the conditions of their business. Eventually, Lakshya promises Jhunjaarrao to find out such a news that would completely change the conditions of the Jhunjaar newspaper. 

Acting upon Ganga's suggestion, Lakshya ends up publishing a fake news that the gang of Taklu Haiwan has terrorised Shrirangpur. His idea works out successfully and Jhunjaar gets good marketing. The Shrirangpur police resume their pursuit and Constable 100 is hired for night duty. Uma and Mahesh get transferred to Shrirangpur for extracting information about Taklu Haiwan and tracking down his gang, respectively. Constable 100 refuses to believe that the news of Lakshya is true.

For gaining Constable 100's trust, Lakshya poses as Taklu Haiwan and enters his house but at this point, his lie is exposed before him and Mahesh.  Despite this, Mahesh forgives Lakshya and decides to stay in Shrirangpur for a few more days. However, things take a turn when Taklu Haiwan extracts information about Lakshya's fake news through his henchmen. Implementing their plan, Taklu Haiwan and his henchmen actually enter the village of Shrirangpur on Ganesh Jayanti (festival dedicated to Lord Ganesha).

That night, Taklu Haiwan and his henchmen come to rob the house of Sarpanch Kavale (Bhalchandra Kulkarni), who is stabbed to death by Taklu Haiwan. Lakshya is shocked to witness this and quickly clicks a photograph of Taklu Haiwan having committed the murder before escaping to a forest where his leg gets fractured. The next morning, Mahesh and Constable 100 find Lakshya in the forest and hospitalise him. At the hospital, Lakshya desperately tries to explain that Taklu Haiwan has killed the Sarpanch but everyone refuse to believe him.

To make matters worse, the photograph of Taklu Haiwan also turns out to be blank as Lakshya's camera was shaken while clicking it. Mahesh decides to leave for Mumbai but he and Uma end up finding the Sarpanch's dead body. Realising that Lakshya's words were true, they rush to the hospital where Taklu Haiwan and one of his henchmen have arrived in disguise to kill Lakshya. Mahesh kills the henchman and thwarts Taklu Haiwan, taking the responsibility of protecting Lakshya on himself.

Meanwhile, a frustrated Taklu Haiwan swears to finish off both Lakshya and Mahesh. After a yet unsuccessful attempt of having Lakshya killed at his house, Taklu Haiwan sends two of his henchmen at Mahesh's circuit house to complete his mission. However, Mahesh saves Lakshya's life once again and manages to arrest one of the two henchmen. He and Constable 100 torture the henchman so that he can reveal the whereabouts of Taklu Haiwan's hideout but in vain.  

The next day, Mahesh leaves for the remand of the arrested henchman. However, Ganga visits the fearful Lakshya and tricks him into stepping out of the circuit house. This results in both Lakshya and Ganga being abducted by four of Taklu Haiwan's henchmen. Meanwhile, Mahesh allows the arrested henchman to escape and chases him to Taklu Haiwan's hideout with Constable 100. Upon arriving, Lakshya and Ganga are freed and it is revealed that Uma was also hiding inside Mahesh's car trunk. 

Together, Mahesh, Lakshya, Uma, Ganga and Constable 100 overpower Taklu Haiwan and his henchmen before calling in the police to the scene. As a result, Taklu Haiwan and his henchmen are arrested and sent to prison for their crimes, and Mahesh and Lakshya are satisfied for having beaten Taklu Haiwan in his tracks for good. In the end, Jhunjaarrao is made the new Sarpanch of the village, while Constable 100 also agrees for Lakshya and Ganga's marriage. 

The film ends with Mahesh leaving the village with Uma and Lakshya asking him when will they meet again, to which, Mahesh replies "Aata aapli bhet ekdam dhadakebaaz" ("Now our meeting will be very powerful"), as an announcement of Mahesh Kothare's next upcoming film Dhadakebaaz (1990).

Cast 
 Mahesh Kothare as CID Inspector Mahesh Jadhav
 Laxmikant Berde as Laxmikant Ghorpade alias Lakshya
 Nivedita Joshi as Uma Desai  
 Priya Arun as Ganga
 Deepak Shirke as Constable 100
 Jairam Kulkarni as Jhunjaarrao Ghorpade 
 Rahul Solapurkar as Taklu Haiwan
 Bhalchandra Kulkarni as Sarpanch Kavale
 Prakash Phadtare as Inspector Tonage
 Ravindra Berde as Editor of Apradh (Uma's employer) 
 Ashok Pahelwan as Taklu Haiwan's henchman 
 Kishore Nandlaskar as Guest in Shrirangpur 
 Ambar Kothare as Mumbai Police Commissioner (Mahesh's employer)

Soundtrack

References 

1989 films
1980s Marathi-language films